The Dictionary of Science, Literature and Art was a single-volume reference work published in the mid-19th century by Longman's in the United Kingdom and by Harper Brothers in the United States. At the time it was considered a highly successful compendium of general but scholarly information. It was part of a trend toward cheaper, smaller reference works targeted at the middle and working classes.

The first edition was published in 1842 with 1352 pages. It was reprinted in 1845, 1847, 1848 and 1851. A second, revised edition was published in 1852 in 1423 pages. It was expanded to three volumes in 1866. The final edition was published in 1875 in three volumes.

The original editor in chief William Thomas Brande and associate editor was Joseph Cauvin. Upon Brandes death in 1866, Sir George William Cox took over as editor.

In the United States, the first edition was reprinted by Harper in 1844.

Harper's Book of Facts 

Harper's later published a successor called Harper's Book of Facts in 1895 with an updated edition in 1906.

References

External links 
A dictionary of science, literature, & art; comprising the history, description, and scientific principles of every branch of human knowledge; with the derivation and definition of all the terms in general use London, Longman, Brown, Green, and Longmans, 1842.
A Dictionary of science, literature, and art : comprising the history, description, and scientific principles of every branch of human knowledge; with the derivation and definition of all the terms in general use New York : Harper & brothers 1844
A dictionary of science, literature & art.  London : Longman, Green, and co., 1875.

Harper's Book of Facts 
Harper's book of facts; a classified history of the world; embracing science, literature, and art New York, Harper & Brothers 1895
Harper's book of facts; a classified encyclopaedia of the history of the world, a record of history from 4004 B.C. to 1906 A.D., with more than one hundred thousand references to subjects in the realms of science, literature, art, and government New York and London, Harper & brothers 1906

1842 non-fiction books
19th-century encyclopedias
English-language encyclopedias
British encyclopedias
Publications established in 1842
Single-volume general reference works